Hurry Up Mode is the debut studio album by the Japanese rock band Buck-Tick. It was released on both vinyl and CD on April 4, 1987 through Taiyo Records with the catalog number LEO 009. The CD version had two bonus tracks, "Vacuum Dream" and "No-No-Boy". It was later remixed and re-released in 1990, excluding the two bonus tracks (see Hurry Up Mode (1990 Mix)). "Moonlight" was later re-recorded again for their 1992 compilation album Koroshi no Shirabe: This Is Not Greatest Hits. The album peaked at number one on the Japanese Indie Albums chart. The remix version was placed 1st on the Oricon albums chart, selling 212,430 copies.

Track listing

CD

Personnel
 Atsushi Sakurai - lead vocals
 Hisashi Imai - lead guitar, backing vocals
 Hidehiko Hoshino - rhythm guitar, backing vocals
 Yutaka Higuchi - bass
 Toll Yagami - drums

Additional performers
 Kosuzu Yokomachi; Mariko Ohhira - backing vocals
 Hiromi Kokubu - piano

Production
 Sawaki; Buck-Tick - producers
 Masayuki Minato; Nishimura - engineers, mixing
 Tomoyo Tanaka - cover art
 Mamoru Tsukada - photography

References

Buck-Tick albums
1987 debut albums
Japanese-language albums